Carter Presidential Center can refer to:
 Carter Center
 Jimmy Carter Library and Museum